The 2006 Four Continents Figure Skating Championships was an international figure skating competition in the 2005–06 season. It was held at the World Arena in Colorado Springs, USA on January 25–28. Medals were awarded in the disciplines of men's singles, ladies' singles, pair skating, and ice dancing. The compulsory dance was the Tango Romantica.

Medals table

Results

Men

Ladies

Pairs

Ice dancing

External links
 

Four Continents Figure Skating Championships, 2006
Four Continents Figure Skating Championships
Sports competitions in Colorado Springs, Colorado
Four Continents
Four Continents Figure Skating Championships
Four Continents Figure Skating Championships
2000s in Colorado Springs, Colorado